Berwyn South School District 100 is located in Berwyn, Illinois.

Schools

Elementary schools
 Emerson Elementary School
 Hiawatha Elementary School
 Irving Elementary School
 Komensky Elementary School
 Pershing Elementary School
 Piper Elementary School

Middle schools
 Freedom Middle School
 Heritage Middle School

References

External links

School districts in Cook County, Illinois
Berwyn, Illinois